Hanna Johansson (born 7 February 1985) is a Swedish racing cyclist, who currently rides for French amateur team VC Morteau-Montbenoît. In October 2020, she rode in the 2020 Tour of Flanders for Women's race in Belgium.

References

External links

1985 births
Living people
Swedish female cyclists
Place of birth missing (living people)
20th-century Swedish women
21st-century Swedish women